The BT postcode area, also known as the Belfast postcode area, covers all of Northern Ireland and was the last part of the United Kingdom to be coded, between 1970 and 1974. This area is a group of 82 postcode districts in Northern Ireland, within 44 post towns and around 47,227 live postcodes.

With a population of over 1.8 million people, BT is the second most populous UK postcode area, after the B postcode area (Birmingham, 1.9 million). It is the only UK postcode area that has land borders with non-UK postcode areas and is also the only UK postcode area that borders the European Union. BT borders nine Eircode routing areas in the neighbouring Republic of Ireland: F94, F93, F91, N41, H23, H18, H14, A91, and A75.



Coverage

Belfast
Belfast had already been divided into numbered districts. Today, the Belfast post town covers postcode districts BT1 to BT17 and part of BT29. In common with all addresses in Northern Ireland, Belfast postcodes start with the letters BT, a mnemonic of the capital city's name. The commercial centre of the city is designated BT1 and the surrounding districts form a roughly sequential clockwise ring around the city. The postcode of the Royal Mail offices at Tomb Street in Belfast is BT1 1AA.

|-
! BT1
| BELFAST
| Belfast City Centre (City Hall and north)
| Belfast City Council
|-
! BT2
| BELFAST
| Belfast City Centre (south of City Hall)
| Belfast City Council
|-
! BT3
| BELFAST
| Belfast Harbour Estate (including Belfast City Airport)
| Belfast City Council 
|-
! BT4
| BELFAST
| East Belfast: Sydenham, Belmont, Stormont, Ballyhackamore (Part)
| Belfast City Council 
|-
! BT5
| BELFAST
| East Belfast: Castlereagh, Clarawood, Crossnacreevy, Gilnahirk, Knock, Braniel (Part), Ballyhackamore (Part)
| Belfast City Council, Lisburn & Castlereagh City Council 
|-
! BT6
| BELFAST
| East Belfast: Castlereagh, Woodstock, Cregagh, Knockbreda
| Belfast City Council, Lisburn & Castlereagh City Council 
|-
! BT7
| BELFAST
| South Belfast: Ormeau, Botanic, University
| Belfast City Council 
|-
! BT8
| BELFAST
| South Belfast: Saintfield Road, Four Winds, Carryduff, Knockbreda, Newtownbreda
| Belfast City Council, Lisburn & Castlereagh City Council
|-
! BT9
| BELFAST
| South Belfast: Malone, Lisburn Road, Taughmonagh, Stranmillis
| Belfast City Council
|-
! BT10
| BELFAST
| South Belfast: Finaghy
| Belfast City Council 
|-
! BT11
| BELFAST
| West Belfast: Andersonstown, Lenadoon, Suffolk, Ladybrook, Turf Lodge
| Belfast City Council 
|-
! BT12
| BELFAST
| South Belfast: Sandy Row, The Village 
West Belfast: Falls Road
| Belfast City Council 
|-
! BT13
| BELFAST
| North Belfast: Shankill Road, Woodvale, Ballygomartin, Springmartin, Glencairn, Highfield. 
West Belfast: Clonard
| Belfast City Council 
|-
! BT14
| BELFAST
| North Belfast: Crumlin Road, Ballysillan, Upper Ballysillan, Ardoyne
| Belfast City Council, Antrim & Newtownabbey Borough Council
|-
! BT15
| BELFAST
| North Belfast: York Road, Antrim Road, New Lodge, Sailortown
| Belfast City Council 
|-
! BT16
| BELFAST
| East Belfast: Dundonald
| Lisburn & Castlereagh City Council 
|-
! BT17
| BELFAST
| West Belfast: Dunmurry, Hannahstown, Twinbrook, Poleglass, Lagmore.
North Lisburn: Derriaghy, Seymour Hill
| Belfast City Council, Lisburn & Castlereagh City Council 
|-
! BT29
| BELFAST
| Belfast International Airport
| Antrim & Newtownabbey Borough Council 
|}
The only BELFAST addresses in BT29 are at Belfast International Airport.  All other addresses in BT29 are under the post town CRUMLIN.

Rest of Northern Ireland 
The remainder of Northern Ireland is divided into 43 other post towns which are further divided into postcode districts BT18–BT49, BT51–BT57, BT58 (non-geographic postcode district reassigned from Belfast to Newtownabbey post town), BT60–BT71, BT74–BT82 and BT92–BT94. Certain addresses in BT29 located at Belfast International Airport (a total of 31 delivery points) are in the post town of BELFAST despite being geographically under the post town of CRUMLIN, which has the remaining 7,206 delivery points in that postcode area.

|-
! BT18
| HOLYWOOD
| Holywood, Craigavad.
| Ards and North Down
|-
! BT19
| BANGOR
| Bangor (outside Ring Road), Crawfordsburn, Groomsport, Helens Bay
| Ards and North Down
|-
! BT20
| BANGOR
| Bangor (within Ring Road).
| Ards and North Down
|-
! BT21
| DONAGHADEE
| Donaghadee
| Ards and North Down
|-
! BT22
| NEWTOWNARDS
| Newtownards, Ardkeen, Ballyhalbert, Ballywalter, Carrowdore, Cloughey, Greyabbey, Kircubbin, Millisle, Portaferry, Portavogie.
| Ards and North Down
|-
! BT23
| NEWTOWNARDS
| Newtownards, Ballygowan, Comber, Conlig, Killinchy, Moneyrea.
| Ards and North Down, Lisburn and Castlereagh
|-
! BT24
| BALLYNAHINCH
| Ballynahinch, Drumaness, Saintfield
| Newry, Mourne and Down, Lisburn and Castlereagh
|-
! BT25
| DROMORE
| Dromore, Dromara, Finnis, Waringsford.
| Armagh, Banbridge and Craigavon, Lisburn and Castlereagh
|-
! BT26
| HILLSBOROUGH
| Hillsborough, Annahilt, Culcavy.
| Lisburn and Castlereagh
|-
! BT27
| LISBURN
| Lisburn, Cargacreevy, Drumalig, Drumbo, Hilden, Hillhall, Lambeg.
| Lisburn and Castlereagh
|-
! BT28
| LISBURN
| Lisburn, Ballinderry Lower, Ballinderry Upper, Stoneyford
| Lisburn and Castlereagh
|-
! BT29
| CRUMLIN
| Crumlin, Aldergrove, Dundrod, Glenavy, Nutts Corner
| Antrim and Newtownabbey
|-
! BT30
| DOWNPATRICK
| Downpatrick, Ardglass, Ballyhornan, Ballykinler, Castleward, Clough, Crossgar, Kilclief, Killard, Killough, Killyleagh, Listooder, Loughinisland, Seaforde, Strangford, Toye
| Newry, Mourne and Down
|-
! BT31
| CASTLEWELLAN
| Castlewellan, Ballyward.
| Newry, Mourne and Down, Armagh, Banbridge and Craigavon
|-
! BT32
| BANBRIDGE
| Banbridge, Annaclone, Ballinaskeagh, Ballyroney, Corbet, Katesbridge, Lenaderg, 
 Leitrim,Loughbrickland, Seapatrick.
| Armagh, Banbridge and Craigavon
|-
! BT33
| NEWCASTLE
| Newcastle, Bryansford, Dundrum.
| Newry, Mourne and Down
|-
! BT34
| NEWRY (South Down section)
| Newry, Annalong, Ballymartin, Cabra, Hilltown, Kilcoo, Kilkeel, Mayobridge, Rathfriland, Rostrevor, Warrenpoint
| Newry, Mourne and Down
|-
! BT35
| NEWRY (South Armagh section)
| Jerrettspass, Bessbrook, Camlough, Crossmaglen, Belleeks, Newtownhamilton, Poyntzpass
| Newry, Mourne and Down
|-
! BT36
| NEWTOWNABBEY
| Newtownabbey, Mossley, Glengormley
| Antrim and Newtownabbey
|-
! BT37
| NEWTOWNABBEY
| Newtownabbey
| Antrim and Newtownabbey
|-
! BT38
| CARRICKFERGUS
| Carrickfergus, Ballycarry, Greenisland, Kilroot, Whitehead.
| Mid and East Antrim
|-
! BT39
| BALLYCLARE
| Ballyclare, Ballynure, Doagh, Parkgate, Straid, Templepatrick.
| Antrim and Newtownabbey, Mid and East Antrim
|-
! BT40
| LARNE
| Larne, Ballygally, Glenoe, Glynn, Islandmagee, Kilwaughter, Magheramorne, Millbrook.
| Mid and East Antrim
|-
! BT41
| ANTRIM
| Antrim, Dunadry, Muckamore, Randalstown, Toomebridge.
| Antrim and Newtownabbey
|-
! BT42
| BALLYMENA
| Broughshane, Cullybackey, Galgorm, Kells.
| Mid and East Antrim
|-
! BT43
| BALLYMENA
| Cargan, Knockanully
| Mid and East Antrim
|-
! BT44
| BALLYMENA
| Portglenone, Carnlough, Glenarm, Clogh Mills, Rasharkin, Glenariff/Waterfoot, Cushendun, Cushendall, Dunloy, Loughguile, Glarryford.
| Mid and East Antrim, Causeway Coast and Glens, Mid Ulster
|-
! BT45
| MAGHERAFELT
| Magherafelt, Ballyronan, Bellaghy, Castledawson, Desertmartin, Draperstown, Knockloughrim, Moneymore, Tobermore, Fallalea, Fallaghloon
| Mid Ulster
|-
! BT46
| MAGHERA
| Maghera, Lisnamuck, Swatragh, Upperlands
| Mid Ulster
|-
! BT47
| LONDONDERRY
| Derry, Waterside, Claudy, Feeny, Dungiven, Eglinton, Park, New Buildings.
| Derry City and Strabane
|-
! BT48
| LONDONDERRY
| Derry, Cityside, Ballynagard, Coshquin, Rosemount, The Collon, Culmore.
| Derry City and Strabane
|-
! BT49
| LIMAVADY
| Limavady, Ballykelly
| Causeway Coast and Glens
|-
! BT51
| COLERAINE
| Coleraine, Aghadowey, Articlave, Bellany, Blackhill, Castlerock, Castleroe, Garvagh, Kilrea, Macosquin, Ringsend
| Causeway Coast and Glens
|-
! BT52
| COLERAINE
| Coleraine, Ballyvelton, Cloyfin
| Causeway Coast and Glens
|-
! BT53
| BALLYMONEY
| Ballymoney, Dervock, Armoy, Ballybogy.
| Causeway Coast and Glens
|-
! BT54
| BALLYCASTLE
| Ballycastle, Ballintoy, Ballypatrick, Ballyvoy, Cape Castle, Glenshesk, Maghercashel, Maghernahar, Moyarget, Torr, Rathlin Island.
| Causeway Coast and Glens
|-
! BT55
| PORTSTEWART
| Portstewart
| Causeway Coast and Glens
|-
! BT56
| PORTRUSH
| Portrush, Craigahullier, Urbalreagh.
| Causeway Coast and Glens
|-
! BT57
| BUSHMILLS
| Bushmills, Castlecatt, Dunseverick, Portballintrae
| Causeway Coast and Glens
|-
! BT58
| NEWTOWNABBEY
| No longer in use, formerly Child Support Agency (defunct)
| non-geographic
|-
! BT60
| ARMAGH
| Killylea, Tynan, Belcoo, Middletown, Keady, Darkley, Markethill, Kingsmills
| Armagh, Banbridge and Craigavon, Newry, Mourne and Down
|-
! BT61
| ARMAGH
| Armagh, Collone, Hamiltonsbawn, Kilmore, Loughgall, Richhill.
| Armagh, Banbridge and Craigavon
|-
! BT62
| CRAIGAVON
| Craigavon, Portadown, Tandragee, Clare, Scotch Street.
| Armagh, Banbridge and Craigavon
|-
! BT63
| CRAIGAVON
| Gilford, Laurencetown, Portadown, Scarva
| Armagh, Banbridge and Craigavon
|-
! BT64
| CRAIGAVON
| Craigavon (West): Knockmenagh, Mandeville.
| Armagh, Banbridge and Craigavon
|-
! BT65
| CRAIGAVON
| Craigavon (East): Drumgor, Legaghory, Tullygally, Brownlow.
| Armagh, Banbridge and Craigavon
|-
! BT66
| CRAIGAVON
| Derryadd, Derrytrasna, Dollingstown, Donaghcloney, Lurgan, Waringstown
| Armagh, Banbridge and Craigavon
|-
! BT67
| CRAIGAVON
| Aghagallon, Aghalee, Gawley's Gate, Lurgan, Magheralin, Moira
| Armagh, Banbridge and Craigavon
|-
! BT68
| CALEDON
| Caledon, Minterburn
| Mid Ulster
|-
! BT69
| AUGHNACLOY
| Aughnacloy, Carnteel
| Mid Ulster
|-
! BT70
| DUNGANNON
| Dungannon, Ballygawley, Cappagh, Castlecaulfield, Donaghmore, Galbally, Garvaghy, Pomeroy, Rock, Seskilgreen
| Mid Ulster
|-
! BT71
| DUNGANNON
| Dungannon, Benburb, Blackwatertown, Bush, Coalisland, Killycolpy, Ardboe, Moygashel, Stewartstown
| Mid Ulster
|-
! BT74
| ENNISKILLEN
| Enniskillen town, Boho
| Fermanagh and Omagh
|-
! BT75
| FIVEMILETOWN
| Fivemiletown, Clabby
| Mid Ulster, Fermanagh and Omagh
|-
! BT76
| CLOGHER
| Clogher
| Mid Ulster
|-
! BT77
| AUGHER
| Augher
| Mid Ulster
|-
! BT78
| OMAGH
| Omagh, Dromore, Drumquin, Eskra, Fintona, Killynure, Newtownstewart, Seskanore, Trillick
| Fermanagh and Omagh
|-
! BT79
| OMAGH
| Omagh, Drumlea, Glengawna, Gortin, Mountfield, Plumbridge, Rosnamuck, Sheskinshule, Sixmilecross
| Fermanagh and Omagh
|-
! BT80
| COOKSTOWN
| Cookstown, Coagh, Tullyhogue
| Mid Ulster
|-
! BT81
| CASTLEDERG
| Castlederg, Aghyaran, Clare, Garvetagh, Killen, Killeter, Mournebeg, Scraghey, Spamount
| Derry City and Strabane
|-
! BT82
| STRABANE
| Strabane, Artigarvan, Ballymagorry, Bready, Clady, Douglas Bridge, Dunamanagh, Sion Mills, Victoria Bridge
| Derry City and Strabane
|-
! BT92
| ENNISKILLEN
| Lisnaskea, Florencecourt, Derrylin, Newtownbutler
| Fermanagh and Omagh
|-
! BT93
| ENNISKILLEN
| Belleek, Belcoo, Kesh, Derrygonnelly, Garrison
| Fermanagh and Omagh
|-
! BT94
| ENNISKILLEN
| Irvinestown, Ballinamallard, Brookeborough, Tempo, Maguiresbridge, Lisbellaw
| Fermanagh and Omagh
|}

Note

Map

See also
List of postcode areas in the United Kingdom
Postcode Address File

References

External links

Postcode areas of the United Kingdom
Communications in Northern Ireland